The Dayton Skyhawks were a professional indoor American football team based in Dayton, Ohio.  They were a charter member of the original Indoor Football League in 1999.

They lasted both of the league's two seasons and folded when the league disbanded.  Earnest Wilson was the Skyhawk's first head coach and general manager. Chris MacKeown coached the team during the 2000 season.

Season-by-season 

|-
|1999 || 6 || 6 || 0 || 2nd Southern || Lost Semifinal (Peoria)
|-                                                               
|2000 || 6 || 8 || 0 || 3rd EC Southern ||  Lost Round 1 (Green Bay)
|-
!Totals || 12 || 16 || 0 ||colspan="2"|

References

Indoor Football League (1999–2000) teams
Defunct American football teams in Ohio
American football teams in Dayton, Ohio
1999 establishments in Ohio
2000 disestablishments in Ohio
American football teams established in 1999
American football teams disestablished in 2000